is a passenger railway station located in the city of  Kōka, Shiga, Japan operated by the third-sector Shigaraki Kohgen Railway.

Lines

Station layout
The station consists of two opposed side platforms connected by a level crossing, of which only the platform adjacent to the station is in use. The station is staffed.. Directly outside of the station, there is 5.3 m tall statue of a bake-danuki, which is a well-known product of the area. The statue's clothes are changed depending on the season. Items recovered from Shigaraki train disaster are on display within the station building.

Adjacent stations

History
Shigaraki Station opened on May 8, 1933 as a station of the Japanese Government Railway (JGR).  The station was closed from October 1, 1943 to July 25, 1947, when it reopened as a station of the Japan National Railway (JNR). The station became part of the West Japan Railway Company on April 1, 1987 due to the privatization and dissolution of the JNR and was transferred to the Shigaraki Kohgen Railway on July 13, 1987.

Passenger statistics

Surrounding area
 former Shigaraki town hall
 Shigaraki Traditional Industry Center
Shigaraki Central Hospital

Gallery

See also
List of railway stations in Japan

References

External links

Shigaraki Railway home page

Railway stations in Japan opened in 1933
Railway stations in Shiga Prefecture
Kōka, Shiga